The Code of Ur-Nammu is the oldest known law code surviving today. It is from Mesopotamia and is written on tablets, in the Sumerian language c. 2100–2050 BCE.

Discovery
The first copy of the code, in two fragments found at Nippur, in what is now Iraq, was translated by Samuel Kramer in 1952. These fragments are held at the Istanbul Archaeological Museums. Owing to its partial preservation, only the prologue and five of the laws were discernible. Kramer noted that luck was involved in the discovery:

Further tablets were found in Ur and translated in 1965, allowing some 30 of the 57 laws to be reconstructed. Another copy found in Sippar contains slight variants.

Background

The preface directly credits the laws to king Ur-Nammu of Ur (2112–2095 BCE). The author who had the laws written onto cuneiform tablets is still somewhat under dispute. Some scholars have attributed it to Ur-Nammu's son Shulgi.

Although it is known that earlier law-codes existed, such as the Code of Urukagina, this represents the earliest extant legal text. It is three centuries older than the Code of Hammurabi. The laws are arranged in casuistic form of IF (crime) THEN (punishment)—a pattern followed in nearly all later codes. It institutes fines of monetary compensation for bodily damage as opposed to the later lex talionis ('eye for an eye') principle of Babylonian law. However, murder, robbery, adultery and rape were capital offenses.

The code reveals a glimpse at societal structure during Ur's Third Dynasty. Beneath the lugal ("great man" or king), all members of society belonged to one of two basic strata: the lu or free person, or the slave (male, arad; female geme). The son of a lu was called a dumu-nita until he married, becoming a "young man" (gurus). A woman (munus) went from being a daughter (dumu-mi) to a wife (dam), then if she outlived her husband, a widow (nu-ma-su), who could remarry.

Content
The prologue, typical of Mesopotamian law codes, invokes the deities for Ur-Nammu's kingship, Nanna and Utu, and decrees "equity in the land".

One mina ( of a talent) was made equal to 60 shekels (1 shekel = 8.3 grams, or 0.3 oz).

Surviving laws
Among the surviving laws are these:

See also

Cuneiform law
List of ancient legal codes
List of artifacts in biblical archaeology
Ancient Mesopotamian units of measurement

Notes
1.A slave who has married (and presumably will soon have children) cannot be set free and forced to leave the household so that the owner can save themselves the expense of supporting the slave's family. Slaves needed the consent of their masters to marry, so this ensured they were not just turned out: even if they were now a freedman, they were still members of the household and they and their family had to be supported by it.
2. This presumably relates to a freeman killing another man's slave, as a slave is the preferred fine above a simple payment in silver, building on the trend in laws 31 and 32 for payment in kind for certain offences. The fact that the fine in silver is equivalent to cutting off a free man's foot also seems to suggest this.

References

Further reading
 Miguel Civil. "The Law Collection of Ur-Namma." in Cuneiform Royal Inscriptions and Related Texts in the Schøyen Collection, 221–286, edited by A.R. George, 2011, 
 S. N. Kramer. (1954). "Ur-Nammu Law Code". Orientalia, 23(1), 40. 
 Martha T. Roth. "Law Collections from Mesopotamia and Asia Minor." Writings from the Ancient World, vol. 6. Society of Biblical Literature, 1995, 
 Claus Wilcke. "Der Kodex Urnamma (CU): Versuch einer Rekonstruktion." Riches hidden in secret places: ancient Near Eastern studies in memory of Thorkild Jacobson, edited by Zvi Abusch, 2002, 
 Claus Wilcke, "Gesetze in sumerischer Sprache." Studies in Sumerian Language and Literature: Festschrift für Joachim Krecher, 455–616, in particular 529–573, edited by N. Koslova et al., 2014, 

21st-century BC literature
Legal codes
Sumer
Codes of conduct
Ancient Near East law